Gazania rigida, the "Karoo Gazania", is a species of flower native to the Western Cape and Northern Cape Provinces of South Africa.

Description

The flowers vary in colour from yellow to reddish-orange, often with brown-to-black patches at the petal bases. They are born on long, setose scapes.

The involucre is hairy (setose), obtusely bell-shaped (campanulate) and 8-10mm wide. In addition to a few irregularly-placed, ciliate parietal bracts, the involucre also has at its apex two or three rows of terminal bracts. 
 The outermost row of terminal bracts are linear with acute tips and ciliate margins, much like the parietal bracts. 
 The innermost row of terminal bracts are triangular with obtuse-acute tips and membranous margins (in contrast, those of Gazania serrata are acuminate). 

The linear-lanceolate leaves are usually pinnate with linear-to-elliptic lobes, but can sometimes also be simple. The upper leaf-surface is usually spinescent-to-rough, but can sometimes be smooth. Like many Gazania species, the leaf undersides are tomentose, and the lower leaf margins are spinescent-to-ciliate. (In contrast, the leaves of Gazania serrata are sticky and have more clearly serrated margins). 

Gazania rigida is very similar to a number of other Gazania species, including Gazania serrata, Gazania krebsiana, Gazania pectinata and Gazania linearis among others. Species boundaries between these are not clear, and they are frequently confused in practice.

References

Flora of South Africa
rigida
Plants described in 1768
Taxa named by Nicolaas Laurens Burman